This is a list of the nominees and winners of the Black Reel Award for Best Supporting Actress in a Television Movie/Cable. The category was reinstated in 2013 after a five—year hiatus.

Cicely Tyson & Alfre Woodard are the biggest winners in this category with two wins. Tyson, Woodard along with Jurnee Smollett, Loretta Devine, Lisa Arrindell Anderson & CCH Pounder have the most nominations in this category with two.

Multiple Nominees
1. Cicely Tyson, Kimberly Elise, Alfre Woodard, Jurnee Smollett, Lisa Arrindell Anderson, CCH Pounder & Mo'Nique - 2 nominations

Winners/Nominees

References

Black Reel Awards
Television awards for Best Supporting Actress